Mahendra Lawoti (born February 25, 1965) is professor at the department of political science at Western Michigan University, writer of several books and Ph.D. from the University of Pittsburgh with dissertation of Exclusionary Democratization: Multicultural Society and Political Institutions in Nepal.

References

Western Michigan University faculty
University of Pittsburgh alumni
Living people
American political scientists
1965 births